Vishka is a 2017 Maldivian crime film directed by Ravee Farooq. Produced by Aishath Rishmy under Yaaraa Productions, the film stars Farooq, Rishmy and Ahmed Saeed in pivotal roles. The film was released on 8 May 2017.

Cast 
 Aishath Rishmy as Vishka / Raisha
 Ravee Farooq as Ishan
 Ahmed Saeed as Manik
 Mohamed Waheed as Hameed
 Ali Nadheeh as Yaatte
 Ali Mufeed as Zarre
 Ahmed Fauzan Fauzy as Reehan
 Ibrahim Fiznan as Retey
 Hawwa Nisha as Reema
 Ahmed Aman as Janah
 Mariyam Shahuza as Zeenath
 Mohamed Ziyad as Shaheem Ali

Development 
Requested by producer Aishath Rishmy, the story for the film was written by Abdulla Wisham, while the screenplay was written by Mahdi Ahmed. The first draft of the screenplay was completed in 2013, though it was re-written and revised more than 10 times before the screenplay was finalised in 2015. Pre-production of the film was completed in two months time. Madhoship was hired for all the technical works, while Hussain Anees was hired as the make-up artist of the film, marking their first film to do the technical works and make-up respectively. Several new faces will be making debut with the film in supporting roles. Noora Rasheedh worked as the stylist in the film, who chose and arranged all outfits, while Riffath designed and custom tailored some of the outfits for the lead character. Vmedia was appointed as the media partner of the film.

Soundtrack

Release 
On 30 May 2016, Yaaraa Productions announced the film and revealed their first look poster and teaser of the trailer to the media. The film was slated for release at Olympus along with Schwack Cinema. The first look of the film garnered a positive hype to the film. The media compared its first look with that of AR Murugadoss-directed Akira'''s first look which features Sonakshi Sinha, for having a similar design and style, though it was revealed on 20 June 2016.

 Reception 
The teaser of the film was met with positive response from the critics. Ahmed Nadheem from Avas'' wrote: "This 43 seconds created more suspense than any other Dhivehi films released this year".

Accolades

References

External links
 

2017 films
Maldivian crime thriller films
Yaaraa Productions films
2017 crime thriller films
Films directed by Ravee Farooq